Waterloo West High School is one of three public high schools under the auspices of the Waterloo Community School District in Waterloo, Iowa.  The school is located at the intersection of E. Ridgeway Ave. and Baltimore Ave.

Mascot
The school mascot is Westy the Wahawk. The name "Wahawk" is a portmanteau of the city name (Waterloo) and the county name (Black Hawk). Much controversy has surrounded the mascot, which was once an Indian chief thought to be politically incorrect. It was later changed to a flying eagle flying through a flaming hoop but was changed back after 3 years.

The logo is currently the "Flying W," a capital "W" with a feather hanging off of it.  More recently an arrow has been added behind the "Flying W".  This is also the only school in the United States with "Old Rose" as its school color.

Demographics
In the 2015–2016 school year, West High had an enrollment of 1,638 students. The racial makeup of the school during the 2015–2016 school year was 60% White, 18.5% African-American, 10% Hispanic, 4.6% Multiracial, 4.5% Asian and 2.4% from other races.

Athletics 
The Wahawks compete in the Mississippi Valley Conference in the following sports:
Cross Country
Volleyball
Football
2006 Sophomore MVC Conference Champions
Basketball
 Boys' 1925 Class A State Champions
Wrestling
 17-time State Champions (1942, 1943, 1944, 1945, 1946, 1951, 1952, 1955, 1959, 1965, 1966, 1967, 1969, 1971, 1972, 1977, 1989) 
Swimming
Track and Field
 Boys' 1981 Class AA State Champions
Golf
 Boys' 10-time State Champions (1950, 1951, 1955, 1956, 1957, 1971, 1972, 1973, 1977, 1998)
 Girls' 4-time State Champions (1956, 1957, 1981, 1993)
 Coed 5-time State Champions (1972, 1973, 1980, 1981, 1985)
Soccer
Softball
Baseball
 1991 Class 4A State Champions 
Tennis
 Boys' 1991 Class 2A State Champions
Bowling
 Girls' 2013 Class 2A State Champions
 Boys' 2020 Class 3A State Champions

Notable alumni
Bob Bowlsby, Big 12 Conference commissioner (2012–current), athletic director at Stanford University (2006–2012) University of Iowa (1990–2006).
Dan Gable, 1972 Olympic gold medalist for freestyle wrestling at Munich, former head coach at University of Iowa.
Molly Goodenbour, women's basketball coach, University of San Francisco
Nikole Hannah-Jones, journalist
Don Perkins, former professional football player, Pro Bowl running back for Dallas Cowboys
Cal Petersen, American professional ice hockey player
Jack Rule, Jr., former professional golfer who played on PGA Tour in 1960s
Mike van Arsdale, retired mixed martial artist; current MMA coach
Emily West, country music singer-songwriter, signed with Capitol Records; America's Got Talent (season 9) runner up

See also
List of high schools in Iowa

References

External links
 Waterloo West High School website

Buildings and structures in Waterloo, Iowa
Public high schools in Iowa
Schools in Black Hawk County, Iowa
1922 establishments in Iowa
Educational institutions established in 1922